Windsor Township is a township in Henry County, in the U.S. state of Missouri.

Windsor Township takes its name from the community of Windsor, Missouri.

References

Townships in Missouri
Townships in Henry County, Missouri